Kavalerskoye is a village and rural settlement in the Ust-Bolsheretsky District of the Kamchatka Krai federal subject of Russia.
The village is the administrative center of the Kavalerskoye rural settlement .

Location
 
The village is located on the right bank of the Bolshaya.

History

The village was established by the inhabitants of Bolsheretsk. 
The people of that village on the islands a few miles upstream decided to relocate to a more convenient location on the Kavalerskaya channel six miles down the river. In the spring of 1928, there were already three houses on the Kavalerskaya channel, two more were under construction.
The new village was formed by 1930.
Until 1990, it was called the Bolsheretsky state farm after its location on the right bank of the Bolshaya. 
In 1990 it was renamed Kavalerskoye.

Population

Streets

The village has 11 streets: Levaya Naberezhnaya street, Stroitelnaya street, Sovetskaya street, Shkolnaya street, Ryabikova street, Komsomolskaya street, Pravaya Naberezhnaya street, Naberezhnaya street, Blucher street, Central street, Pervomaiskaya street.

References

Rural localities in Kamchatka Krai